Camino Real is a 1953 play by Tennessee Williams. In the introduction to the Penguin edition of the play, Williams directs the reader to use the Anglicized pronunciation "Cá-mino Réal." The play takes its title from its setting, alluded to El Camino Real, a dead-end place in a Spanish-speaking town surrounded by desert with sporadic transportation to the outside world. It is described by Williams as "nothing more nor less than my conception of the time and the world I live in."

Kilroy, a young American visitor, fulfills some of the functions of the play's narrator, as does Gutman, (named after Sydney Greenstreet's character from The Maltese Falcon, but bearing more resemblance to Signor Ferrari, Greenstreet's character in Casablanca) manager of the hotel Siete Mares, whose terrace occupies part of the stage. Williams also employs a large cast of characters including many famous literary characters who appear in dream sequences. They include Don Quixote and his partner Sancho, Marguerite "Camille" Gautier (see The Lady of the Camellias), Casanova, Lord Byron, and Esmeralda (see The Hunchback of Notre Dame), and others.

Taking place in the main plaza, the play goes through a series of confusing and almost logic-defying events, including the revival of the Gypsy's daughter (Esmeralda)'s virginity and then the loss of it again. A main theme that the play deals with is coming to terms with the thought of growing older and possibly becoming irrelevant.

Production history

Inspiration 
In 1946 Williams wrote an account of the origins of the play, in which he describes how he was visiting Mexico in 1945 and in a romantic, dreamy mood, when:

Premiere 
Camino Real originated with Williams's one-act play, Ten Blocks on the Camino Real, written in 1946 and published by Dramatists Play Service in 1948. This series of 10 scenes, or "blocks", was first staged in a workshop by Elia Kazan at the Actors Studio in 1949. By 1952 Williams had expanded the play into a 16-scene version, and he finalized the text the following year for its publication by New Directions Publishing. For the 1953 Broadway production, directed by Kazan with assistance by Anna Sokolow, the cast included Eli Wallach (as Kilroy), Frank Silvera (as Gutman), Joseph Anthony (as Casanova), Jo Van Fleet (as Marguerite "Camille" Gautier), Jennie Goldstein (as the Gypsy), Barbara Baxley (as Esmeralda), and David J. Stewart (as the Baron).

With only 60 performances on Broadway, the play was not a mainstream success. Brooks Atkinson of The New York Times called it "a strange and disturbing drama," which seemed to be "a dark mirror" of "Mr. Williams's concept of life — full of black and appalling images." Director Elia Kazan later wrote in his memoirs that he had misinterpreted the play by infusing it with excessive naturalism.

London premiere 
The first London production opened on April 8th, 1957 at the Phoenix Theatre. It starred Denholm Elliott as Kilroy, Diana Wynyard as Marguerite, was directed by  Peter Hall and played for two months.

Revivals 
Camino Real was presented on television in 1966 by NET, a PBS predecessor, as Ten Blocks on the Camino Real. A black-and-white production, it was directed by Jack Landau and starred Martin Sheen, Lotte Lenya, Tom Aldredge, Michael Baseleon, Albert Dekker, and Hurd Hatfield.

In 1968, the Los Angeles Mark Taper Forum revived the play with Earl Holliman as Kilroy.

In January 1970, the play enjoyed its first Broadway revival at the Vivian Beaumont Theater at Lincoln Center, directed by Jules Irving and starring Al Pacino (Kilroy), Victor Buono (Gutman), Patrick McVey (Don Quixote), Jean-Pierre Aumont (Casanova), Jessica Tandy (Camille), Sylvia Syms (the Gypsy), David J. Stewart (the Baron), Susan Tyrrell (Esmeralda), and Clifford David (Lord Byron). In his review for The New York Times, critic Clive Barnes wrote "there are people who think that Camino Real was Tennessee Williams's best play, and I believe that they are right. It is a play that seems to have been torn out of a human soul, a tale told by an idiot signifying a great deal of suffering and a great deal of gallantry."

The UK's Royal Shakespeare Company revived the play at the Swan Theatre in 1996. The production was directed by Steven Pimlott, and starred Leslie Phillips as Gutman, Peter Egan as Casanova and Susannah York as Camille.

In June 1999, Nicholas Martin staged a production at the Williamstown Theater Festival, featuring Ethan Hawke (Kilroy), Jeffrey Jones (Gutman), Richard Easton (Casanova), Blair Brown (Marguerite Gautier), Christian Camargo (Baron de Charlus and Lord Byron), Hope Davis (Esmeralda), Kristine Nielsen (The Gypsy), and John Seidman (Lord Mulligan and Don Quixote). Reviewing the production in the New York Times, Ben Brantley wrote that "... in his art as in his life, Williams could be grotesquely excessive and sloppy. But whatever he wrote, he tore it straight from his soul, and in this age of irony there is something especially nourishing in such sustained depths of emotion."

In October 1999, Michael Wilson mounted another revival at the Hartford Stage, with a cast including James Colby (Kilroy), Helmar Augustus Cooper (Gutman), Rip Torn (Casanova), Betty Buckley (Marguerite Gautier), Novella Nelson (Gypsy), Lisa Leguillou (Esmeralda), John Feltch (Baron de Charlus, Lord Byron and Don Quixote), Natalie Brown (Lady Mulligan) and Nafe Katter (Lord Mulligan).

In January 2009, director David Herskovits staged a new production at the Ohio Theater in Manhattan. This short version, which focused on Kilroy as the American boxer (played by Satya Bhabha), was a re-imagination of the original one-act play Ten Blocks on the Camino Real.

From March 3 to April 8, 2012, the Goodman Theatre in Chicago presented a new version by director Calixto Bieito and playwright Marc Rosich.

References

External links 
 

1953 plays
Plays by Tennessee Williams
Broadway plays
Plays based on Don Quixote
Works about Giacomo Casanova
Works based on the Don Juan legend
Cultural depictions of Lord Byron
Cultural depictions of Giacomo Casanova